Showbiz Pa More! is a Philippine television talk show broadcast by Jeepney TV. Directed by Jose Mari Reyes, it is hosted by DJ Jhai Ho, it premiered on May 6, 2018. The show concluded on February 28, 2021 with a total of 169 episodes.

Host
 Jhai Ho

Production 
Katia Montenegro Pla, brand head
Albert Abesamis, creative head
Madonna Carcer, segment producer
Anna Mae Bag-ao, Jennifer Mijares, researchers

References

2018 Philippine television series debuts
2021 Philippine television series endings
Philippine television talk shows
Entertainment news shows in the Philippines
Filipino-language television shows